Tell Me Tomorrow may refer to:

Tell Me Tomorrow (album), 1985, by Angela Bofill
"Tell Me Tomorrow", a song from Smokey Robinson's 1982 album, Yes It's You Lady
"Tell Me Tomorrow", a 1986 song by Desiree Heslop
"Tell Me Tomorrow", a song from Karyn White's 1988 eponymous debut album
"Tell Me Tomorrow", a 2011 song by Sierra Hull